Yakunin (feminine: Yakunina) is a Russian language family name:

 Gleb Yakunin (born 1934), Russian priest and dissident
 Aleksandra Yakunina-Denton (born 1991), English singer better known as Shura
 Vladimir Yakunin (born 1948), president of state-run Russian Railways company

Russian-language surnames